C.S.A.: The Confederate States of America is a 2004 American mockumentary written and directed by Kevin Willmott. It is an account of an alternate history, wherein the Confederacy wins the American Civil War and establishes a new Confederate States of America that incorporates the majority of the Western Hemisphere, including the former contiguous United States, the "Golden Circle", the Caribbean, and South America. The film primarily details significant political and cultural events of Confederate history from its founding until the early 2000s.  This viewpoint is used to satirize real-life issues and events, and to shed light on the continuing existence of racism against Black Americans.

Overview
C.S.A.: The Confederate States of America is set in a world where  President Abraham Lincoln's Emancipation Proclamation failed. Confederate President Jefferson Davis takes the opportunity to secure British and French aid for the Confederacy, allowing Confederate forces to win the Battle of Gettysburg, besiege Washington, D.C., and take over the White House a few months later. As a result, slavery in America survives into the present day and other historical events are affected accordingly.

The film is presented as if it were a British documentary being broadcast on a Confederate television network in San Francisco, California. It opens with a fictional disclaimer that suggests that censorship came close to preventing the broadcast, that its point of view might not coincide with that of the TV network, and that it might not be suitable for viewing by children and "servants". It purports to disagree with an orthodox Confederate interpretation of American history.

The film portrays two historians: Sherman Hoyle, a conservative Southerner (a parody of Shelby Foote); and Patricia Johnson, a black Canadian, as talking heads, providing commentary. Throughout the documentary, Confederate politician and Democratic presidential candidate, John Ambrose Fauntroy V (the great-grandson of one of the men who helped found the C.S.A.), is interviewed. Narration explains fake historical newsreel footage, which is either acted for the production or made of genuine archival footage dubbed with fictional narration.

Racialist adverts appear throughout the movie, including consumer products, television programs, and films, all aimed at white slave-owning families.

At the film's end, titles note that parts of the alternate timeline are based on real history and that some of the racist products depicted did actually exist, in addition to citing Uncle Ben's and Aunt Jemima as contemporary examples (both products were rebranded following the George Floyd protests in 2020).

Cast

 Rupert Pate as Sherman Hoyle, a Confederate American historian who speaks highly of the Confederate American values.
 Evamarii Johnson as Patricia Johnson, an African-Canadian historian whose viewpoints focus on the slaves and minorities oppressed by the Confederate regime.
 Larry Peterson as Senator John Ambrose Fauntroy V, a descendant of Confederate senator John Ambrose Fauntroy I and Democratic candidate for the presidency in 2002.
 Charles Frank as the documentary's narrator.
 Steve Jasen as the voice of Abraham Lincoln
 Arlo Kasper as Old Abraham Lincoln
 Kevin McKinney as Blackface Abraham Lincoln
 Joyce Jefferson as the voice of Harriet Tubman
 Will Averill as Blackface Harriet Tubman
 Brian Paulette as Jefferson Davis
 Lauralei Linzay as Varina Davis
 Sean Blake as Adolf Hitler
 Glenn Q. Pierce as the voice of Robert E. Lee
 Marvin Voth as the voice of Walt Whitman
 John Staniunas as the voice of William Lloyd Garrison
 Greg Funk as the voice of Wendell Phillips
 Kevin Willmott as the voice of Frederick Douglass

Production
Kevin Wilmott began production on the film with a funding from the National Black Programming Consortium (NBPC) and wrote its first draft in 1997.

Willmott, who had earlier written a screenplay about abolitionist John Brown, told interviewers he was inspired to write the story after seeing an episode of Ken Burns' 1990 television documentary The Civil War.  It was produced by Hodcarrier Films.

The film was filmed in Humboldt, Newton and Lawrence cities in Kansas, with a cast and crew coming from the U.S. states of Kansas, Missouri and Iowa as well as Colombia.

Reception
The film grossed $744,165 worldwide in limited release.

On Rotten Tomatoes the film has an approval rating of 80% based on reviews from 66 critics. On Metacritic the film has a score of 62 out of 100 based on reviews from 22 critics, indicating "Generally favorable reviews". Most critics were intrigued by the film's premise, but some found the execution to be lacking primarily due to a low budget.  In 2018 James Berardinelli wrote: "The movie is ultimately more interesting in satire than the presentation of a legitimate alternate timeline. This doesn't invalidate C.S.A.s approach but it limits its effectiveness as a sort of Twilight Zone look at the last 150 years."

Release 
An earlier version of the film premiered on February 21, 2003 at Liberty Hall in Lawrence, Kansas, while the film premiered for the second time, at the Sundance Film Festival in January 2004.

In January 2004, after the film's premiere at the Sundance Film Festival, IFC Films acquired the distribution rights to the film in the United States.

The film received a limited theatrical release in some Southern cities on October 7, 2005, and later received a wide theatrical release on February 15, 2006.

Home media
The film was released on DVD by IFC Films (distributed by Genius Products) on August 8, 2006.

See also
 American Civil War alternate histories
 List of films featuring slavery
 The Domination

References

External links
 
 

2004 films
2004 black comedy films
American alternate history films
American black comedy films
American Civil War alternate histories
American Civil War films
American comedy-drama films
American political satire films
Cultural depictions of Adolf Hitler
Cultural depictions of John F. Kennedy
Cultural depictions of Robert E. Lee
2000s English-language films
Fictional depictions of Abraham Lincoln in film
Films about American slavery
IFC Films films
Political mockumentaries
2004 comedy-drama films
Blackface minstrel shows and films
Films directed by Kevin Willmott
2000s American films